Hamdullah Suphi Tanrıöver (1885 – 10 June 1966) was a highly influential Turkish poet, intellectual, diplomat and politician. He adopted his surname Tanrıöver after the Turkish Surname Law was enacted in 1934.

Life
He was born to Abdüllatif Suphi Pasha, an Ottoman statesman in Constantinople in 1885. He studied at Galatasaray High School graduating in 1904. He later served as a translator, and a teacher for Turkish after earning a certificate.

In Darülfünün, later renamed to Istanbul University, he was appointed professor of Islamic art. During the Turkish Republic era, he was elected to the parliament, and also served as a government minister.

He married Ayşe Saide, who, according to some sources, was a descendant of two former Anatolian beys (Isfendiyarids and Ramazanids).

Tanrıöver died on 10 June 1966. He was interred at Merkezefendi Cemetery in Istanbul.

Poet and orator
During his childhood, his father's mansion was a meeting point of famous poets, and he was influenced by the poet community during his early years. He published his first poems in a literary newspaper published by his uncle in Paris, France. He began writing in Genç Kalemler (literally: "The Young Pens"), a literary periodical. He also distinguished himself as an orator.

Politics 

He took part in a committee, which was tasked to reflect the ordeal of the Turkish population in the Balkans after the Balkan Wars (1912–1913). During the Turkish War of Independence (1919–1923), he took side with Mustafa Kemal Pasha (Atatürk), and became a member of the 1st Parliament of Turkey. He was appointed Director of the Press and Information. Then, he served as the Minister of Education from 13 December 1920 to 20 November 1921 in the 1st, 2nd and the 3rd cabinet of the Executive Ministers of Turkey.

After the proclamation of the Republic, he served again as the Minister of National Education in 4th government of Turkey between 3 March 1925 and 21 December 1925. In 1931, he was appointed ambassador of Turkey to Romania in Bucharest. In 1943, he entered in the parliament from the Republican People's Party. In 1950, he joined the newly founded Democrat Party. Several years later, however, following the struggle for the "Right to Prove" in press, he co-founded the Liberty Party. He lost his seat when his political party was defeated in the 1957 general election.

Books
His books are:
1909 Namık Kemal Bey Magosa'da (Documentary about "Namık Kemal in Famagusta")
1928 Günebakan (essays) 
1931 Dağyolu (orations)
1946 Anadolu Milli Mücadelesi (Anatolian National struggle)

References

External links

1885 births
1966 deaths
Writers from Istanbul
Galatasaray High School alumni
Educators from the Ottoman Empire
Politicians of the Ottoman Empire
Turkish poets
Ambassadors of Turkey to Romania
Republican People's Party (Turkey) politicians
Ministers of National Education of Turkey
Democrat Party (Turkey, 1946–1961) politicians
20th-century Turkish politicians
Burials at Merkezefendi Cemetery
Diplomats from Istanbul
20th-century Turkish diplomats